Bangarada Kalasha (Kannada: ಬಂಗಾರದ ಕಳಶ) is a 1995 Indian Kannada film,  directed by  H. R. Bhargava and produced by S. Shankar. The film stars Vishnuvardhan, Sithara, Anjana and Dheerendra Gopal in the lead roles. The film has musical score by Rajan–Nagendra.

Cast

Vishnuvardhan as Nagaraja
Sithara as Gowri
Anjana
Pavithra Lokesh 
B. V. Radha 
Ramesh Bhat 
Shivaram 
Dheerendra Gopal 
Rajanand
Sudheer
Shobhraj 
Tennis Krishna as Narahari
Janaki
Lakshmi Bhat
Bhavyashree Rai
B. Jaya

Music
"Entha Hennannu Kande" - S. P. Balasubrahmanyam, K. S. Chithra
"Nagu Nagutho Naliyo" - S. P. Balasubrahmanyam, K. S. Chithra
"Nammoora Kerigalalli" - S. P. Balasubrahmanyam, K. S. Chithra
"Sihimuthu Sihimuthu" - S. P. Balasubrahmanyam, K. S. Chithra
"Samsaaravendare" - S. P. Balasubrahmanyam, Sangeetha Katti, Manjula Gururaj
"Aha Anno Kelasa" - S. P. Balasubrahmanyam

References

External links
 

1995 films
1990s Kannada-language films
Films scored by Rajan–Nagendra
Films directed by H. R. Bhargava